is a railway station on the Takayama Main Line in city of Toyama, Japan, operated by West Japan Railway Company (JR West). It is also a freight terminal for the Japan Freight Railway Company.

Lines

Layout
The station has one ground-level side platform and one ground-level island platform serving three tracks. The station has a Midori no Madoguchi staffed ticket office.

Platforms

Adjacent stations

History
The station opened on 1 September 1927. With the privatization of Japanese National Railways (JNR) on 1 April 1987, the station came under the control of JR West.

Passenger statistics
In fiscal 2015, the station was used by an average of 1,049 passengers daily (boarding passengers only).

Surrounding area
Japan National Route 359
former Fuchu Town Hall
Nissan Chemical Company Ltd

See also
 List of railway stations in Japan

References

External links

 

Railway stations in Toyama Prefecture
Stations of West Japan Railway Company
Railway stations in Japan opened in 1927
Takayama Main Line
Toyama (city)
Stations of Japan Freight Railway Company